Pauli Levokari (born 7 April 1978) is a Finnish former professional ice hockey defenceman.

Playing career
Levokari began his career at Ässät his hometown team where he played from 1996 to 2001. He then moved to Jokerit and then HIFK where he recorded then-career high stats of three goals and five assists for eight points in just 21 games.

He was drafted 257th overall by the Atlanta Thrashers in the 2002 NHL Entry Draft and signed with the organisation. He played six games for the AHL's Chicago Wolves and six games in the ECHL for the Greenville Grrrowl before being traded to the Columbus Blue Jackets with fellow Finn Tomi Kallio for another Finn Petteri Nummelin and Chris Nielsen. He spent the rest of the 2002–03 season with the Syracuse Crunch, playing 45 games and scoring four goals and six assists for ten points, his most productive to date. He continued to play for Syracuse until he was traded once more, moving to the Pittsburgh Penguins for fellow minor-league player Brendan Buckley. He finished the season with the Wilkes-Barre/Scranton Penguins and had a short playoff run with the team before returning to Finland.

In 2004, he returned to Ässät for one season before moving to Lukko. In 2006, he signed for SaiPa.

On May 5, 2014, Levokari extended his cameo with KooKoo at the end of the 2013-14 season, in signing an additional one-year contract.

Career statistics

References

External links

1978 births
Arystan Temirtau players
Ässät players
Atlanta Thrashers draft picks
Chicago Wolves players
Finnish ice hockey defencemen
Greenville Grrrowl players
HIFK (ice hockey) players
Imatran Ketterä players
Jokerit players
KalPa players
Kiekko-Vantaa players
KooKoo players
Lukko players
SaiPa players
SønderjyskE Ishockey players
Syracuse Crunch players
Wilkes-Barre/Scranton Penguins players
Living people